Fungible information is the information for which the means of encoding is not important. Classical information theorists and computer scientists are mainly concerned with information of this sort. 
It is sometimes referred as speakable information.

References

Information theory